The Questions We Ask at Night is an EP by American pop rock band Metro Station which was released independently. It leaked onto the internet via blogs and BitTorrent in 2006, but, due to the minimal success online, the band did not take action to remove the leaked versions. Few copies of the EP were ever made due to the minimal demand for the band's music at the time of the EP's release. Five of the songs were later re-recorded for the band's self-titled debut album. "The Love That Left You To Die" was later re-recorded 11 years later and included on the band's 2017 release, "Bury Me, My Love", as a bonus track.

Track listing
 "Seventeen Forever" – 2:51
 "Now That We're Done" – 3:45
 "Kelsey" – 3:18
 "California" – 2:36
 "Goodnight and Goodbye" – 4:03
 "Disco" – 3:20  
 "The Love That Left You to Die" – 3:08

Personnel
Trace Cyrus – Guitar, Vocals
Mason Musso – Vocals, Guitar
Blake Healy – Synthesizer, Beats, Bass
Anthony Improgo – Drums

Metro Station (band) albums
2006 debut EPs